Francisco Armando Meza Castro (born 17 February 1944) is a Mexican retired general and politician from the Party of the Democratic Revolution. From 2009 to 2012 he served as Deputy of the LXI Legislature of the Mexican Congress representing Baja California Sur.

He joined the Mexican Army as a cadet in 1966 and rose to the title of Undersecretary of National Defense in 2008.

References

1944 births
Living people
People from La Paz, Baja California Sur
20th-century Mexican military personnel
21st-century Mexican military personnel
Party of the Democratic Revolution politicians
21st-century Mexican politicians
Politicians from Baja California Sur
Military attachés
Military personnel from Baja California Sur
Members of the Chamber of Deputies (Mexico) for Baja California Sur